The Wind River is a tributary of the Columbia River, in the U.S. state of Washington. Its entire course of  lies within Skamania County. Crusattes River is an old variant name.

Course
The Wind River originates in the Cascade Range, south of Mount Adams and Mount St. Helens. It flows generally south through Gifford Pinchot National Forest, joining the Columbia River near Carson, in the Columbia River Gorge.

See also
List of rivers of Washington
List of tributaries of the Columbia River

References

Columbia River Gorge
Rivers of Washington (state)
Tributaries of the Columbia River
Rivers of Skamania County, Washington
Gifford Pinchot National Forest